The 2000 season was the St. Louis Rams' 63rd in the National Football League (NFL) and their sixth in St. Louis. For the first time in franchise history, the Rams entered the season as the defending Super Bowl champions. The Rams finished the regular-season with a record of 10–6 but would go on to lose to the New Orleans Saints in the Wild Card round of the playoffs. They led the NFL in scoring for a second straight year with 540 points. The Rams became the first team in NFL history to score more than 500 points on offense, while allowing more than 450 points on defense.

Running back Marshall Faulk was named the MVP of the regular season. It was the second straight time a Rams player was named MVP.

After the resignation of Dick Vermeil, who had been the Rams' head coach through St. Louis' 1999 championship season, Mike Martz took over as head coach, and attempted to defend the Rams' Super Bowl XXXIV title. The Rams' "Greatest Show on Turf" continued its offensive dominance, scoring 33.7 points per game.

Statistically, Football Outsiders calculates that the 2000 Rams had the most efficient rushing attack of any single-season NFL team from 1993–2010. The 2000 Rams are one of only three teams in NFL history to score 35 points or more nine times in a single season. The Denver Broncos did it 10 times in 2013. The Rams' offense offset the team's defensive struggles: St. Louis' 471 points allowed in 2000 is the most ever surrendered by an NFL team with a winning record. The Rams had the best offense in the league, but had the worst defense in the league.

The season saw the Rams change their logo and add a new color scheme of navy and gold, replacing blue and yellow, donning new uniforms in the process. The Rams' new logo consisted of a charging blue ram outlined in gold with a matching gold outline. It would be their logo for 16 years.

Offseason

NFL Draft

Staff

Preseason

Regular season

Schedule

Game summaries

Week 1: vs. Denver Broncos

Week 5: vs. San Diego Chargers
The Rams opened their offense with Kurt Warner throwing 14 consecutive passes.

Week 8: at Kansas City Chiefs

Standings

Postseason

Game summaries

NFC Wildcard Game: vs. New Orleans Saints

The Saints won their first playoff game in their 34-year history with quarterback Aaron Brooks' 266 passing yards and four touchdowns, by holding off the defending champion Rams, who scored three touchdowns in the final quarter. Overall, the Rams committed five turnovers while the Saints committed none. Rams quarterback Kurt Warner lost four turnovers (three interceptions and a fumble), while running back Marshall Faulk, who shredded the Saints with 220 rushing yards when they played against them in the regular season, was held to a season low of 24 yards on the ground.

Best performances
 Marshall Faulk, October 15, 208 rushing yards vs. Atlanta Falcons
 Marshall Faulk, December 24, 220 rushing yards vs. New Orleans Saints
 Trent Green, 431 passing yards vs. the Carolina Panthers, (achieved on November 5)
 Kurt Warner, 441 passing yards vs. the Denver Broncos, (achieved on September 4)

Statistics
Led NFL, average yards per play (7.0)
NFL record, combined net yards gained (7,075)
NFL record, passing yards, (5,232)
Led NFL, first downs, passing (247)
Led NFL, passes completed (380)
Led NFL, passing offense
Led NFL, passing touchdowns (37)
Led NFL, percentage of passes completed (64.7%) 
Led NFL, rushing touchdowns (26)
Led NFL, third down efficiency (47.5%)
Led NFL, total offense
Led NFL, total touchdowns (67)
Led NFL, two-point conversions (4, tied)
Led NFL, yards gained per completed pass (14.5)

Roster

Awards and records
 Marshall Faulk, NFL MVP
 Marshall Faulk, Associated Press MVP
 Marshall Faulk, Associated Press All-Pro
Marshall Faulk, All-NFL Team (as selected by the Associated Press, Pro Football Weekly, and the Pro Football Writers of America) 
Marshall Faulk, Associated Press Most Valuable Player 
Marshall Faulk, Associated Press Offensive Player of the Year 
 Marshall Faulk, Daniel F. Reeves Memorial Award
Marshall Faulk, Football Digest Player of the Year
Marshall Faulk, College and Pro Football Newsweekly Offensive Player of the Year 
Marshall Faulk, Miller Lite Player of the Year 
Marshall Faulk, NFC Offensive Player of the Week, week 3 
Marshall Faulk, NFC Offensive Player of the Week, week 7 
Marshall Faulk, NFC Offensive Player of the Week, week 17 
Marshall Faulk, NFC Offensive Player of the Month, October 
Marshall Faulk, NFC Offensive Player of the Month, December 
Marshall Faulk, Pro Football Writers of America Most Valuable Player 
Marshall Faulk, Sporting News Player of the Year 
Marshall Faulk, Sports Illustrated Player of the Year 
London Fletcher, NFC Defensive Player of the Week, week 15 
Trent Green, NFC Offensive Player of the Week, week 11 
 Trent Green, NFC Passer Rating Leader, (101.8 rating) 
Az-Zahir Hakim, All-NFL Team (as selected by the Associated Press, Pro Football Weekly, and the Pro Football Writers of America) 
Az-Zahir Hakim, NFC Special Teams Player of the Week, week 9 
Az-Zahir Hakim, PFW/PFWA All-Pro Team 
Kurt Warner, NFC Offensive Player of the Week, week 5 
Kurt Warner, NFC Offensive Player of the Month, September

Notes

References

http://www.nfl.com/teams/schedule?team=STL&season=2000&seasonType=REG
http://www.nfl.com/teams/schedule?team=STL&season=2000&seasonType=PRE
http://www.pro-football-reference.com/teams/ram/2000.htm

St. Louis Rams
St. Louis Rams seasons
St Louis